Alessandra Pagliaro (born 16 July 1997) is an Italian weightlifter bronze medal at the 2018 European Weightlifting Championships.

Biography
Pagliaro is the sister of the other Italian weightlifting champion Genny Pagliaro. In addition to the European medal, at international senior level she won also a bronze medal, at the 2018 Mediterranean Games.

References

External links
 

1997 births
Living people
Italian female weightlifters
Mediterranean Games bronze medalists for Italy
Mediterranean Games medalists in weightlifting
Athletes of Fiamme Rosse
European Weightlifting Championships medalists
Competitors at the 2018 Mediterranean Games
Weightlifters at the 2014 Summer Youth Olympics
21st-century Italian women